ADOdb is a database abstraction library for PHP, originally based on the same concept as Microsoft's ActiveX Data Objects. It allows developers to write applications in a consistent way regardless of the underlying database system storing the information. The advantage is that the database system can be changed without re-writing every call to it in the application.

Features

ADOdb supports the following databases: 

Firebird
IBM Db2
Interbase
Lightweight Directory Access Protocol (LDAP)
Microsoft Access
Microsoft SQL Server
MySQL
Oracle database
PHP Data Objects (PDO)
PostgreSQL
SQLite
 generic ODBC
MariaDB

Legacy, unsupported or obsolete drivers may still be found in older releases of ADOdb.

In addition to the Database Abstraction Layer, ADOdb includes the following features:

 Schema management tools: a suite of tools to interrogate the attributes of tables, fields and indexes in databases as well as providing cross-database schema management including a full suite of XML based functions
 Date and time library: provides a drop-in replacement for PHP date functions, but provide access to dates outside the normal range of dates supported by normal PHP functions
 Session management tools: allows storing session data in a database table or as encrypted data

References

External links
 
 SourceForge project page

Data access technologies
PHP libraries
Python (programming language) libraries